The Libyan Third Division is the third tier of Libyan football, organised by the Libyan Football Federation.

System
The clubs are sorted into regional groups. The top team in each region is promoted to the Libyan Second Division. Some of the bigger regions (e.g. Tripoli, Benghazi, Jabal al Akhdar and Sirte) can have as many as three clubs promoted to the second tier.

Clubs for 2008-09 season

Abe Al Ashar
Al Ajdabi
Al Akhaa
Al Buraaq
Al Esh'aa
Al Fajr Al Jadeed
Al Fath
Al Hawariyah
Al Hurriyah
Al Libbah
Al Mujahid
Al Nawaris

Al Qadisiya
Al Selfiyoom
Al Shaa'lah
Al Taraabut
Al Tawa'iya
Al Tayaraan
Al Waahaat
Khalid Ben Walid
Nojoom Al Salmani
Nojoom Benghazi
Shuhadaa Abdel Jaleel